The Chisholms is a CBS western miniseries starring Robert Preston, which aired from March 29, 1979, to April 19, 1979; and continued as a television series  from January 19, 1980, to March 15, 1980.

Episodes

Season 1: 1979 miniseries

Season 2: 1980 series

Home media
On June 10, 2014, Timeless Media Group released the complete series on DVD in Region 1.

References

The original mini-series episodes were filmed in Illinois at New Salem State Park near Springfield, and Jubilie State Park near Peoria.

External links 
 

1970s American television miniseries
1970s Western (genre) television series
1980s Western (genre) television series
1979 American television series debuts
1980 American television series endings
CBS original programming
California Trail
Television series by Universal Television
English-language television shows
Films directed by Mel Stuart